Eutelsat I F-3, also known as European Communications Satellite 3 (ECS-3) is a decommissioned communications satellite operated by the European Telecommunications Satellite Organisation (Eutelsat). Launched in 1985, it was operated in geostationary orbit at a longitude of 10° East. It was the third of five satellites launched to form the first-generation Eutelsat constellation.

History 
The European Telecommunications Satellite Organization (Eutelsat) has been servicing the European Economic Community (CEE) since 1977, being formally established by a multi-lateral agreement in 1985. In 1979, European Space Agency (ESA) agreed to design, build, and launch five ECS (European Communications Satellite) spacecraft to be assumed by Eutelsat after on-orbit testing.

The Eutelsat I series of satellites was developed by the European Space Agency (ESA) as part of the European Communications Satellite (ECS) programme. Once launched and checked out in a geostationary orbit over Europe, each satellite was handed to Eutelsat for commercial operations. Four Eutelsat I satellites were successfully launched between 1983 and 1988 (1983, 1984, 1987, and 1988). They served both public and private traffic, including telephone services, fax, data, land mobile service, and television and radio programming. Each had a design life of 7 years and a bandwidth of 72 MHz. ECS-3 was lost in an Ariane 3 launch accident in 1985.

Satellite description 
Constructed by British Aerospace, it was designed to be operated for seven years and carried 12 Ku-band transponders, two of which were set aside as spares. It also only had partial eclipse protection, requiring some channels to be turned off during eclipse periods around the spring and autumn equinoxes. The satellite contained a Mage-2 solid rocket motor to perform orbit circularisation at apogee.

Launch 
ECS-3 was launched by Arianespace, using an Ariane 3 launch vehicle, flight number V15. The launch took place at 23:26:00 UTC on 12 September 1954, from ELA-1 at Centre Spatial Guyanais, at Kourou, French Guiana. Successfully deployed into geostationary transfer orbit (GTO), ECS-2 raised itself into an operational geostationary orbit using its apogee motor.

References 

Spacecraft launched in 1984
Eutelsat satellites